Meghdhanoosh is the first children's music album by Shyamal-Saumil, released on CD in 1999. With 36 songs and a total run time of 2 hours and 4 minutes, it is their best-selling album to date.

Track listing 

1999 albums
Children's music albums